The 2012 Myanmar by-elections were held on 1 April 2012. The elections were held to fill 48 vacant parliamentary seats. Three of those remained vacant as polling in three Kachin constituencies was postponed. There was no plan to fill the additional five seats cancelled in the 2010 election and one seat vacated after the decease of a RNDP member.

The main opposition party National League for Democracy was re-registered for the by-elections on 13 December 2011 as part of the reforms in Burma since 2010. It won in 43 of the 44 seats they contested (out of 45 available). Its leader Aung San Suu Kyi ran for the seat of Kawhmu, and won.

Changes during the term of office

House of Representatives
9 September 2011: Tun Aung Khaing (USDP) replaced Aung Kyaw Zan (RNDP) who had been removed from office.
1 March 2012: Aung Sein Tha (RNDP, Arakan State's Minbya constituency) died in office and was not replaced.

House of Nationalities
28 January 2012: Bogyi a.k.a. Aung Ngwe (USDP, Sagaing Division constituency 2) died in office and was not replaced.
2012: Phone Myint Aung (Rangoon Division constituency 3) left the NDF to join the NNDP.
5 February 2013: Tin Shwe (NDF, Rangoon Division constituency 6) resigned from his seat to become a Hotels and Tourism Deputy Minister and was not replaced.
2013: Maung Sa Pru (RNDP, Arakan State constituency 4) died in office and was not replaced.

Election observers
In February 2012, President Thein Sein remarked that the government would "seriously consider" allowing Southeast Asian observers from the Association of South East Asian Nations to observe the election. The Burmese government confirmed that it had requested for ASEAN election observers to arrive on 28 March, five days before the election. Canada, United States, European Union, China, and North Korea, as well as ASEAN dialogue partners (India, Japan, New Zealand, South Korea, Russia and Australia), were also invited to observe the election, although it remained unclear the degree of access these international observers were to have. The United States sent two election observers and three journalists.

On 13 March 2012, the Union Election Commission approved political party monitors to monitor polling stations during the election. In the previous election, only Union Solidarity and Development Party monitors had been allowed to observe the elections and ballot counts. A civilian-led monitoring group, including members of the 88 Generation Students Group, also scrutinised election irregularities.

On 28 March 2012, Canada's Department of Foreign Affairs and International Trade sent a delegation consisting of Senator Consiglio Di Nino and Parliamentary Secretary to the Minister of Foreign Affairs Deepak Obhrai.

Pre-election controversies
Aung Din of the US Campaign for Burma said that the Burmese government was exploiting the elections to have Western sanctions lifted as quickly as possible, since a free and transparent election had been one of the conditions set by the European Union and American governments. Moreover, the National League for Democracy has pointed out irregularities in voter lists and rule violations by local election committees. On 21 March 2012, Aung San Suu Kyi was quoted as saying "Fraud and rule violations are continuing and we can even say they are increasing."

With regard to the invitations of international election observers, a US State Department spokesperson said that the Burmese government fell short of expectations to accommodate observers during the entirety of the campaign season (as typically done), which is nearing the end, as a select number of observers were allowed only to observe the election:

Asian Network for Free Elections (ANFREL), a Bangkok-based election monitoring organisation, has publicly called the election observations inadequate, failing to meet international standards, being too restrictive (only two observers are allowed per government, or five for ASEAN nations), and coming too late (invitations were sent less than two weeks before the election date), all of which make it logistically impossible to monitor all 48 polling stations. On 20 March 2012, Somsri Hananuntasuk, executive director of ANFREL, was deported from Yangon, purportedly for entering the country on a tourist visa.

On 23 March 2012, the three by-elections in Kachin State, namely in the constituencies of Mogaung, Hpakant and Bhamo Townships, were postponed due to the security situation there.

Two days before the by-elections, at press conference, Suu Kyi remarked that the voter irregularities were "beyond what is acceptable for democratic elections," said she did not consider the campaign "genuinely free and fair" and referred to acts of intimidation (such as stone-throwing incidents and vandalism) toward party members. On 1 April, the opposition National League for Democracy alleged irregularities, claiming that ballot sheets had been tampered to allow the election commission to cancel the vote for Suu Kyi's party.

Two Australian MPs (Janelle Saffin and Mathias Cormann), who were selected to observe the by-elections as part of Australia's monitoring team, were denied visas to enter the country.

Aftermath
Much of the international reaction on the by-elections revolved around the sanctions imposed by Western countries (including the United States, Australia, and the European Union). President Thein Sein and the Burmese government were eager to work with Aung San Suu Kyi to remove these measures.

President Thein Sein remarked that the by-elections were conducted "in a very successful manner."

The Union Solidarity and Development Party said it would lodge official complaints to the Union Election Commission on poll irregularities, voter intimidation, and purported campaign incidents that involved National League for Democracy members and supporters. The National League for Democracy also sent an official complaint to the commission, regarding ballots that it claimed had been tampered with wax.

In response to the by-elections, a Chinese Ministry of Foreign Affairs spokesman said:

ASEAN leaders, including those from Cambodia, Malaysia, and Indonesia, called for the immediate removal of sanctions. Singapore's Prime Minister said the following: "President Thein Sein has been much bolder than many observers have expected. ASEAN is happy that Myanmar has been able to take these steps forward." Australia's foreign minister, Bob Carr, said the Australian government was planning to loosen sanctions, but not abolish them altogether.

US Senator John McCain, who had met with Aung San Suu Kyi in January 2012, said:

On 4 April 2012, the Obama administration announced that it would nominate an ambassador to the country and ease some travel and finance restrictions, without specifying a time table. Secretary of State Hillary Clinton said of the elections:

To normalise diplomatic relations between the countries, she also said that following the nomination of an ambassador, the US would establish USAID mission in Burma, ease restrictions on export of finance services and developmental assistance and facilitate travel for some government officials, although targeted sanctions toward "individuals and institutions that remain on the wrong side of these historic reform efforts" would remain in place. A few sanctions (in the financial, agriculture, tourism and telecommunications sectors), are directly controlled by the executive branch, but most of the imposed sanctions were legislated by Congress, and were to take a lengthy process to remove. On 6 April 2012, the Obama administration nominated Derek Mitchell, who was then serving as the American special envoy to Burma, as United States Ambassador to Burma.

The European Union, which had already eased some sanctions and travel restrictions (including on Thein Sein), agreed to review travel bans and asset freezes on individuals tied to the previous ruling junta, the State Peace and Development Council on 23 April 2012. UK Foreign Secretary William Hague suggested that easing of restrictions would be contingent on the release of political prisoners and further progress.

Other scholars noted that the by-elections, which were a relatively minor event, given the number of seats at stake, were not as defining and important as other steps toward national reconciliation. Some called removal of sanctions premature, while others considered sanctions ineffective in the reform process.

Results

House of Nationalities

Six of the 224 seats in the Amyotha Hluttaw (House of Nationalities) were up for election. A by-election was not held in one remaining vacant seat, with this seat instead continuing to remain vacant until the 2015 General Election.

House of Representatives

37 of the 440 seats in the Pyithu Hluttaw (House of Representatives) were up for election. By-elections were not held in seven remaining vacant seats, with these seats instead continuing to remain vacant until the 2015 General Election.

|-
| style="text-align:left;" colspan="2"|Total||40|| || || ||100||100|| ||
|-
| style="text-align:left;" colspan="10"|Source: ALTSEAN Burma
|-

State and Regional Hluttaws

2 of the 860 seats in the State and Regional Hluttaws were up for election.

|-
| colspan=2|Total||2|| || || ||100|| || ||
|-
| style="text-align:left;" colspan="10"|Source:
|-

By Constituency

House of Nationalities (Amyotha Hluttaw)

Ayeyarwady Region
Pyapon and Dedaye Townships make up Constituency No. 10.

Bago Region
Oktwin and Htantabin Townships make up Constituency No. 7.

Magway Region

Sagaing Region
Kanbalu, Kyunhla, Ye-U and Taze Townships make up Constituency No. 3.

Banmauk, Kawlin, Wuntho and Pinlebu Townships make up Constituency No. 7.

Shan State
Lashio, Tangyan, Mongyai, Hsenwi and Kunlong Townships make up Constituency No. 3.

House of Representatives (Pyithu Hluttaw)

Ayeyarwady Region

Bago Region

Mandalay Region

Magway Region

Mon State

Naypyidaw Union Territory

Sagaing Region

Shan State

Taninthayi Region

Yangon Region

Regional Parliaments

See also
 2011–2012 Burmese political reforms

Notes

References

2012
2012 elections in Asia
Elections
Burmese democracy movements
Politics of Myanmar